In linguistics, the term conjunct has three distinct uses:
A conjunct is an adverbial that adds information to the sentence that is not considered part of the propositional content (or at least not essential) but which connects the sentence with previous parts of the discourse. Rare as it may be, conjuncts may also connect to the following parts of the discourse.
It was raining. Therefore, we didn’t go swimming.
It was sunny. However, we stayed inside.
You are such a dork. Still, I love you from the bottom of my heart.
A conjunct is one of the terms that are conjoined in a conjoining construction. Conjuncts are conjoined by means of a conjunction, which can be coordinating, subordinating or correlative. Conjuncts can be words, phrases, clauses, or full sentences.
[Gretchen and her daughter] bought [motor oil, spark plugs, and dynamite].
Take two of these and call me in the morning.
A verb form, for example the conjunct verb endings of Old Irish or the conjunct mood (sometimes called the subjunctive mood) of Algonquian languages.

This article discusses the first kind of conjunct.

Semantic functions 
English conjuncts often have the following functions

Listing (indicating that what follows is a list of propositions)
To begin with, I have to tell you that I'm most displeased with your performance in the show. I also think you did a bad job painting the house. You're a lousy cook. You smell. Your hat is ... etc.

Enumerative (indicating items on a list of propositions)
First, we have to buy bread. Second, we need to take the car to the garage. Third, we have to call your dentist and make an appointment.

Additive (indicating that the content of the sentence is in addition to the preceding one)
He has no money. In addition, he has no means of getting any.

Summative (summing up, or concluding, on the preceding sentence(s))
A is B. A is C. To sum up, A is several things.

Appositive (rephrasing the preceding sentence)
The French love music. In other words, music is appreciated in France.

Resultative/inferential (indicating that the content of the sentence is a result of the events expressed in the preceding sentence)
Miss Gold lost her job. She, therefore, had no money.

Antithetic (indicating that the content of the sentence is in contrast to the content of the preceding sentence)
It is said that water flows up hill. On the contrary, it flows downhill

Concessive (indicating that the content of the sentence "exists" despite the content in the preceding sentence)
It is very cold. I went for my morning walk, however.

Temporal (indicating temporal relation between the content of the sentence and the preceding sentence)
I had lunch. Meanwhile, my wife had her hair cut.

See also
Disjunct

Syntactic entities